Ro-31, originally named Submarine No. 70, was an Imperial Japanese Navy Kaichu-Type submarine of the Kaichu V (Toku Chu) subclass. After a diving accident in 1923 prior to completion, she was salvaged, rebuilt, and completed in 1927. She served in a training role during World War II, surrendered at the end of the war in September 1945, and was scuttled in April 1946.

Design, description and construction
The submarines of the Kaichu V sub-class were designed for anti-shipping operations and carried more fuel and had greater range and a heavier gun armament than preceding Kaichu-type submarines. They displaced  surfaced and  submerged.

For surface running, the submarines were powered by two  Sulzer diesel engines, each driving one propeller shaft. When submerged each propeller was driven by a  electric motor. They could reach  on the surface and  underwater.

The submarines were armed with four internal bow  torpedo tubes and carried a total of eight torpedoes. They were also armed with a single  deck gun and one 6.5 mm machine gun.

Ro-31 was laid down as Submarine No. 70 on 25 September 1921 by Kawasaki at Kobe, Japan, and was launched on 15 February 1923.

Accident, salvage and commissioning
On 21 August 1923, and accidental sinking during sea trials killed 88 men — 46 Imperial Japanese Navy personnel and 42 shipyard workers — out of 93 on board. Five men survived the sinking. Her commanding officer was among the survivors, and on 14 March 1924 he was found responsible for the loss of his submarine and fined 100 yen.

 
Submarine No 70 was refloated on 24 October 1924 and dismantled. She was laid down again on 20 December 1924 to be rebuilt with the materials used in her original construction. She was relaunched on 25 September 1926 and was attached to the Sasebo Naval District the same day. She was completed and commissioned on 10 May 1927 and was renamed Ro-31 that day.

Service history

Pre-World War II
Upon commissioning, Ro-31 was attached to the Sasebo Naval District, to which she remained attached throughout the pre-World War II period. On 15 November 1934, she was reassigned to Submarine Division 25. She was decommissioned and placed in the Fourth Reserve on 15 December 1938.

World War II

Ro-31 was still in reserve when the Pacific Campaign of World War II began on 7 December 1941 (8 December 1941 in East Asia) with the Japanese attack on Pearl Harbor, Hawaii. She was recommissioned on 9 February 1942 to serve as a training submarine, initially attached to the Kure Naval District beginning on the day she was recommissioned, then to the Yokosuka Naval District from 14 July 1942 to 15 January 1943, and then to the Kure Naval District again until 15 January 1944, when she again was decommissioned and placed in the Fourth Reserve in the Kure Naval District. The Japanese struck her from the Navy list on 25 May 1945.

Disposal

Ro-31 was on the Japanese coast in the western Seto Inland Sea awaiting disposal when hostilities between Japan and the Allies ended on 15 August 1945. She surrendered to the Allies on 2 September 1945.

Notes

References
, History of Pacific War Vol.17 I-Gō Submarines, Gakken (Japan), January 1998, 
Rekishi Gunzō, History of Pacific War Extra, "Perfect guide, The submarines of the Imperial Japanese Forces", Gakken (Japan), March 2005, 
The Maru Special, Japanese Naval Vessels No.43 Japanese Submarines III, Ushio Shobō (Japan), September 1980, Book code 68343-44
The Maru Special, Japanese Naval Vessels No.132 Japanese Submarines I "Revised edition", Ushio Shobō (Japan), February 1988, Book code 68344-36
The Maru Special, Japanese Naval Vessels No.133 Japanese Submarines II "Revised edition", Ushio Shobō (Japan), March 1988, Book code 68344-37
The Maru Special, Japanese Naval Vessels No.135 Japanese Submarines IV, Ushio Shobō (Japan), May 1988, Book code 68344-39

Ro-29-class submarines
Kaichū type submarines
Ships built by Kawasaki Heavy Industries
1923 ships
1926 ships
World War II submarines of Japan
Shipwrecks in the Pacific Ocean
Shipwrecks of Japan
Maritime incidents in August 1923
Japanese submarine accidents
Maritime incidents in 1946
Scuttled vessels